Federalism in the United Kingdom aims at constitutional reform to achieve a federal UK or a British federation, where there is a division of legislative powers between two or more levels of government, so that sovereignty is decentralised between a federal government and autonomous governments in a federal system.

The United Kingdom is a constitutional monarchy governed via parliamentary democracy. It comprises the countries of England, Scotland and Wales, as well as Northern Ireland. The UK also operates a system of devolution from a central UK parliament and prime minister as head of government, to the devolved legislatures of the Scottish Parliament, Senedd  and Northern Ireland Assembly with first ministers. In England, only Greater London, combined authorities, and the counties of Cornwall and Yorkshire, currently have varying degrees of devolved powers, with proposals for a England-wide or regional devolution.

Compared to the current system of devolution, in a federal system, autonomy as well as devolved powers would be considered constitutionally protected, requiring more than an Act of Parliament to modify or revoke powers.  Autonomy could also potentially be applied uniformly across the entire United Kingdom, compared to the varying levels of devolution at present. The Scotland Act 2016 and the Wales Act 2017 made the Scottish Parliament and Senedd permanent parts of the British constitution, requiring a referendum in each respective country to remove the legislatures, although the UK parliament still retains the sovereign right to adjust devolved powers.

Federalism was first proposed in the late 19th century to address increasing calls for Irish Home Rule, the awarding of autonomy for Ireland within the United Kingdom of Great Britain and Ireland. The proposals failed and the Irish Free State was formed instead. Since a system of devolution was implemented in the late 20th century, some have proposed that a transition be made towards a federation or confederation, as an effort by unionists to combat separatism.

History of nation devolution

Scotland, Northern Ireland and Wales 

In the late 19th and early 20th centuries, Irish home rule was a divisive political issue. The First and Second Home Rule Bills failed to pass the UK Parliament. The Third Home Rule Bill was introduced in 1912 by Prime Minister H. H. Asquith, intended to provide home rule in Ireland, with some additional proposals for home rule in Scotland, Wales, and areas of England. The implementation of the Bill was delayed by the outbreak of the First World War. At war's end the UK parliament, responding to Northern Irish Protestant lobbying, passed the Fourth Home Rule Bill which divided Ireland into a six-county Northern Ireland and a twenty-six county Southern Ireland, each with its own parliament and judiciary. The Southern Parliament only met once: London acknowledged the sovereignty of southern Ireland as the Irish Free State, within the British Commonwealth, at the end of 1921. The Northern Ireland Parliament remained until 1972 when it was abolished due to sectarian conflict in the Troubles.

The Scotland Act 1978 became law on 31 July 1978, requiring 40% of the Scottish electorate to support the formation of an assembly. Although 52% of those who voted supported an assembly, this amounted to 33% of the total electorate and so an assembly was not formed. In 1997 a referendum was held in Scotland on a Scottish parliament which was supported by 74.3% of Scots. In 1998 the Scotland Bill was introduced in the UK Parliament and became law as the Scotland Act 1998 later that year. The Scottish parliamentary elections were held in 1999 and were followed by the re-establishment of the Scottish parliament.
In Wales, a referendum on a Welsh assembly was held, also in 1997, and resulted in a 50.3% majority in favour. The Government of Wales Act was passed in the UK parliament in 1998 and the National Assembly for Wales was formed in 1999 in Cardiff. The National Assembly for Wales was renamed Senedd Cymru/Welsh Parliament, with the Presiding Officer, Elin Jones,saying that its renaming represented the increased powers and responsibilities of the Senedd.

In 2014, Scotland voted to remain in the UK, though a plurality of Scots wanted greater autonomy within the UK. This culminated in the Scotland Act of 2016 which declared that Scotland's devolved institutions were permanent, and granted the Scottish Parliament and government powers over taxation and welfare.

The Wales Act 2017 defined the National Assembly and devolved institutions to be a permanent component of the UK constitution, and any abolition of such institutions would require a referendum. The act also changed the model of operation of the devolved institutions from a "conferred powers model" to a "reserved powers model". The Assembly was given the power to decide its own name and voting system of members.

Proposals for English Parliament 

There have been proposals for the establishment of a single devolved English Parliament to govern the affairs of England as a whole. This has been supported by groups such as English Commonwealth, the English Democrats and Campaign for an English Parliament, as well as the Scottish National Party and Plaid Cymru who have both expressed support for greater autonomy for all four nations while ultimately striving for a dissolution of the Union. Without its own devolved Parliament, England continues to be governed and legislated for by the UK Government and UK Parliament which gives rise to the West Lothian question. The question concerns the fact that, on devolved matters, Scottish MPs continue to help make laws that apply to England alone, although no English MPs can make laws on those same matters for Scotland. Since the 2014 Scottish independence referendum there has been a wider debate about the UK adopting a federal system with each of the four home nations having its own, equal devolved legislatures and law-making powers.

In September 2011 it was announced that the British government was to set up a commission to examine the West Lothian question. In January 2012 it was announced that this six-member commission would be named the Commission on the consequences of devolution for the House of Commons, would be chaired by former Clerk of the House of Commons, Sir William McKay, and would have one member from each of the devolved countries. The McKay Commission reported in March 2013. Following the election of a Conservative majority government in the 2015 general election, new parliamentary procedures and a Legislative Grand Committee were enacted to bring it into effect. The measures were subsequently abolished in 2021.

Federation proposals

19th and 20th centuries 
Federalism was proposed in the 1870s by Isaac Butt and his Home Rule party. Federalism was also proposed by Joseph Chamberlain in the mid-1880s. It gained significant support during the constitutional and home rule crisis in Ireland in particular.

A UK federation government was proposed in 1912 by Winston Churchill, Member of Parliament for Dundee, which also included proposals for English regions governed by a regional parliament as part of a UK federation. Potential areas included Lancashire, Yorkshire, the Midlands and London.

David Lloyd George campaigned for Welsh devolution, beginning with the devolution of the Church in Wales which finally came about in 1920. Lloyd George felt that disestablishment, land reform and other forms of Welsh devolution could only be achieved if Wales formed its own government within a federal imperial system. Lloyd George's Government of 1918 also gave considerable thought to a federal government to relieve tensions in Ireland, particularly in combination with conscription for the First World War.

In 1977, Tam Dalyell, then MP for West Lothian, raised the "West Lothian question" on the issue of an English parliament during a debate on devolution of powers to Scotland and Wales.

21st century timeline

David Melding 
In September 2013, Conservative MS for South Wales Central, David Melding produced a book for the Institute of Welsh Affairs (IWA) discussing federalism. He suggested that parliaments in a federal UK should all be sovereign and that a balance of powers between a central parliament and the national parliaments would emerge following a new "Act of Union". He suggests that disputes could be resolved in the Supreme Court.

Liberal Democrats 
Since March 2014, the Liberal Democrats have been committed to a policy of UK federalism. Their proposal for a federal UK originally included:

 Transferring additional powers to the Senedd Cymru / Welsh Parliament to have equal devolution to the Scottish Parliament
 A need dependent equitable distribution of resources between different parts of the UK
 A Declaration of Rights document
 Election to the House of Commons via Single Transferable Vote
 Replacing the House of Lords with an upper house and a more democratic mandate 

In 2021 the Liberal Democrats updated their stance on a federal UK with a policy motion and a background paper calling for regional parliaments throughout England whose powers would approach those of the Scottish Parliament, representing a near symmetric arrangement in which the regions of England would be constitutionally equivalent to Scotland, Wales and Northern Ireland as states of the federal union but allowing for a parallel English legislature for English-only affairs, England remaining as a single legal jurisdiction. The policy specifically calls for the House of Lords to be replaced by a federal Senate with representatives from the nations and/or regions and calls for significant fiscal decentralisation: a target of 50% of public spending to be controlled by the subnational governments. Party policy also retains the prior call for a Constitutional Convention with the aim of building a consensus for the drafting of a federal constitution.

Institute of Economic Affairs (IEA) 
The think-tank IEA produced a report in 2015 that suggested that the UK should become a federal country. It concluded that responsibilities by and large should be transferred to Scotland and England, Wales and Northern Ireland or Scotland and Rest of UK. It suggested that federal government should have very few functions which would include defence, border control and foreign affairs.

Chuka Umunna 
An English parliament as part of a federal UK was suggested by Labour politician Chuka Umunna in July 2015.

Constitutional Reform Group 
The Constitutional Reform Group is a group made up of politicians from all parties. Its Steering Committee is composed of Robert Gascoyne-Cecil, 7th Marquess of Salisbury; Robert Rogers, Baron Lisvane; former First Minister of Wales Carwyn Jones; former first minister of Scotland Lord Jack McConnell; and Lord David Trimble, the first and former First Minister of Northern Ireland, among others. The group produced their first draft of a new Act of Union Bill in July 2016. An Act of Union Bill 2018 was subsequently introduced as a Private Members' Bill in the House of Lords on 9 October 2018.

On 24 April 2021, an "Act of Union Bill 2021" was published. This includes:
 The continued existence and sovereignty of a UK Parliament with exclusive legislative powers for central matters
 The continued existence of a Welsh Parliament, Scottish Parliament and Northern Irish Assembly
 The formation of an English Parliament OR Regional Devolution for England
 The abolition of powers of the UK parliament to intervene in the Scottish and Welsh Parliaments and Governments
 Each MP is referred to as either a Welsh MP, English MP, Scottish MP or Northern Ireland MP
 The abolition or reform of the House of Lords
 A scrutiny committee for all four parliaments in both options for the House of Lords. Each national parliament proposes their own committee member for the UK scrutiny committee

Central matters to include:
 Constitution: The Crown, the UK, Parliament, Scotland Act 1998 & 2016, Government of Wales Acts, Northern Ireland Act 1998, Ministers of the Crown
 Foreign Affairs: foreign affairs, international treaties and conventions, EU membership, NATO membership, European Economic Area, Defence
 Rights: Human rights
 Economic Affairs: Central bank functions, monetary policy, government borrowing, currency, regulation of financial services
 Taxation: central taxes
 Law and order: Supreme Court, national security
 Home affairs: nationality, immigration, extradition, emergency powers
 Public Service: The civil service, political parties

Proposed models 
In April 2018, Isobel Lindsay, a board member of Scotland's economic and political think-tank, Common Weal, suggested the following two models:

 The Four Nations proposal: A UK Federation composed of England, Wales, Scotland & Northern Ireland
 Three Nations plus English Regions: A UK federation composed of Wales, Scotland, Northern Ireland & English regions
 Council of the Isles: Building upon the British–Irish Council to form a Council of the Isles which could include Wales, Scotland, England, Northern Ireland and the independent Republic of Ireland. This could also allow an independent Scotland to be a part of this council.
England is by far the largest single unit in the United Kingdom by population (84%) and by area (54%) and thus contributes to the  justification for a "Three Nations plus English regions" model.

The Federal Union and the Federal Trust 
The Federal Union is a pressure group that supports a codified federal constitution for the United Kingdom, arguing that governance remains too centralised. In October 2018, Andrew Blick, of King's College London and the Federal Union, proposed a Federalist Constitution for the UK. He also suggests that a single English parliament would not be effective and that regional federalism of England would be more effective; and that the regions of England, created for statistical purposes, are included in one proposed model for a UK federation. The Federal Trust has also proposed a UK Federation as a potential option for the UK's constitutional future.

Unionists 
In February 2020, political analyst John Curtice suggested that the UK's decision to leave the European Union, which was supported by a majority in England and Wales but not in Scotland and Northern Ireland, may have strengthened the Scottish independence movement and proved problematic for the Good Friday Agreement. As such, some people such as the former head of the Department for Exiting the European Union, Philip Rycroft, have proposed federalism as a way of ensuring the Union continues.

Jeremy Corbyn 

A report commissioned by the UK Labour Party during the leadership of Jeremy Corbyn was published in February 2021. The report, titled "Remaking the British State: For the many Not the few" proposed constitutional reform of the devolved governments of the UK and establishment of a federal UK system.

The report recommended the following:

 A UK constitutional convention supported by citizens’ assemblies with reform options
 A codified constitution, also significantly reducing the powers of the monarch
 Replacing the House of Lords with a federal senate of nations & regions
 A council of the union including first ministers of England, Wales, Scotland and Northern Ireland and a Prime minister of the UK
 Proportional representation in the House of Commons;
 Permanent constitutional independence for the Scottish parliament, Senedd Cymru/Welsh Parliament and the Northern Irish executive
 Increased borrowing & policymaking powers for the Scottish Parliament (including social security, alcohol taxation, drugs policy & postgraduate immigration)
 Devolution of policymaking and financial powers such as borrowing to English regionas and councils

Welsh Labour proposals 

The Welsh Labour Government produced a report update for the reformation of the United Kingdom in June 2021. This report summary outlined a proposed 20 key changes to devolution in the UK. This proposed reform of the structure of devolution for the countries of the UK would build a stronger and more durable UK, according to Mark Drakeford.

The Welsh Labour proposal for "far reaching federalism" are summarised as follows:

Principles 

 The UK becomes a voluntary union of 4 nations.
 Devolution is permament and cannot be undone without agreement from electorate.
 Equalise devolution across nations, to become as devolved as possible.

Law-making 

 Each parliament/assembly in the UK decides its own size and how members are elected.
 The UK Parliament should not legislate on devolved matters without consent.
 A centralised source of funding for running costs of devolved parliaments/assembly.
 Representation of devolved nations in the House of Commons. 
 House of Lords reformed to reflect the make-up of the United Kingdom & protects the constitution and devolution.

Inter-governmental relations 

 Governments must be treated as equals
 Ministers are responsible and held to account for duties in their own country without interference from other governments.
 The UK government does not fund other governments’ responsibilities without consent.
 Regular, organised inter-governmental co-operation for benefit of UK.
 Devolved governments have a say in international relations and trade.
 UK bodies that work for every country in the UK.
 Continued impartiality of the civil service serving the Welsh, Scottish & UK governments, working with the Northern Ireland civil service.

Financial matters 

 Funding based on need. No UK funding outside these arrangements without consent.
 Needs-based grant from the UK government to devolved nations (raised by devolved and local taxes and borrowing).
 Formation of an independent public body overseeing funding across UK.
 Each government determines and is held accountable for tax and spending priorities.

Justice 

 Justice and policing devolved to Wales (as it is in Scotland and Northern Ireland).
 Supreme Court membership reflects the whole of the UK.

Constitution matters 

 A Constitutional Convention with UK wide membership considering UK governance and inter-governmental relationships.

Keir Starmer and Gordon Brown 

Keir Starmer, leader of the UK Labour party, also agreed in January 2022 to "quickly" reform the UK if Labour formed the next national government. He also promised a “radical devolution of power” which would include a written constitution. More specific details in Starmer's radical devolvement or federalisation plans were said to be lacking. Starmer also tasked Gordon Brown with heading a "Constitution Commission" for prospective reform of the UK, a commission which would become active under a Labour government. Brown has suggested federalism as a viable option following Brexit and, according to Adam Tomkins, supported "a reformed Britain, a new federal settlement, and further powers for a supercharged Holyrood". Brown proposed:
 European powers transferred from the EU to the Scottish Parliament for agriculture, fisheries, environmental regulation and areas of employment and energy.
 £800 million transferred from the EU to Scotland as would be given with EU membership
 Scottish Parliament regional policy, take action to support its own industries.
 VAT rates set by Scottish Parliament
 Scottish Parliament negotiates with European countries on policies within its powers
 EU access for Scottish industries and universities for research and the Erasmus programme for students.
 Scotland guaranteed a place in the European Court of Human Rights or the EU Social Chapter
 Bank of England reformed as a Bank of England, Scotland, Wales and Northern Ireland with fully-staffed representation within Scotland.
In September 2022, Gordon Brown's plans were said to include; further devolution of taxation to Scotland, Wales, and England’s regions; a new mechanism to "community groups" for the promotion of bills in parliament; constitutional guarantee of social and economic rights; replacement of the House of Lords by an upper house of nations and regions (previously cited in the party's 2015 and 2019 manifestos); minimum of three years’ funding to local and devolved governments for longer-term planning. First minister of Wales, Mark Drakeford suggested  that Gordon Brown's recommendations would ensure practical ways in which devolution could not be overruled.

A League-Union of the Isles 
In March 2022, Glyndwr Jones of the Institute of Welsh Affairs produced a document "A League-Union of the Isles" discussing constitutional options for the UK with a preface by former first minister of Wales Carwyn Jones. The author presents multiple potential constitutional options for the UK nations including: devolution, federalism, confederalism, confederal-federalism, sovereignty within the EU and independence. The author settles on confederal-federalism, a union of sovereign nations that stands between federalism and a confederation, with an agreed confederal treaty between national parliaments, which jointly form a "Council of the Isles". The proposed union would include the following:

 Rights of movement, residence and employment in any nation within the union
 Each nation would have its own legal jurisdiction in addition to a "Supreme Court of the Isles"
 A common currency and a central "Bank of the Isles"
 Each nation would have its own tax regimes and contribute a proportion of their GDP to the "Council of the Isles"
 Defence, foreign policy, internal trade, currency, large scale economics and "Isles affairs" governed by the "Council of the Isles"
 Each nation holds 4 seats at the UN general council and one collective seat at the UN Security Council

Independent Commission on the Constitutional Future of Wales 
The Independent Commission on the Constitutional Future of Wales is an ongoing commission that will make recommendations about Wales’ constitutional future. Having their first meeting on the 25th of November 2021, Professor Laura McAllister and Dr Rowan Williams are co-chairing the commission. Professor McAllister has stated that all options are on the table – including independence. This independent commission was established in 2022 by the Welsh Government and has two broad objectives which include consideration and development of options for reform of constitutional structures of the UK, and progressive principal options to strengthen Welsh democracy and deliver improvements for Wales.

In its interim report of December 2022, The Independent Commission on the Constitutional Future of Wales proposes the following as an option for a federal UK:

 The UK Parliament and Government’s responsibility for the UK is separate to England
 Reform of the House of Lords
 Devolved financial responsibility for taxation
 Optional devolved financial responsibility for welfare

Suggested potential benefits 
A report by The Federal Trust suggested the following potential benefits of a federal UK:
 Constitution for UK level and sub-UK level identity
 Constitutionally form states from the devolved administrations. Stops undermining from UK government
 Consistent democratic governance across the UK
 Addressing the "English Question"
 Potential to avoid economic, financial, cultural centralisation and concentration in London
 Identify powers appropriate to be used at a sub-UK level and Westminster
 Clarification of the status of tiers of government below UK government
 Needs-based redistribution at a federal level, replacing the Barnett Formula & resolving the UK and devolved government tensions
 Resolving dilemma of the status of House of Lords

Political party positions 

Members of the UK Labour Party, including their leader Keir Starmer, have supported federalism, but the UK-wide party have not made a commitment. The Liberal Democrats are the only mainstream political party yet to have formally adopted a policy for a federal United Kingdom and which outlines the structure of the proposed federation in line with the "Three Nations plus English Regions" model. Other political parties prefer the status quo or to increase autonomy further than federalism via independence.

UK parties 
Liberal Democrats

Scottish parties 
Scottish Labour

Scottish Liberal Democrats

Welsh parties 
Welsh Labour

Welsh Liberal Democrats

English regional parties 
Mebyon Kernow: Support a Cornish Assembly.

Yorkshire Party: Supports a Regional Parliament.

See also 

 Scottish devolution
 1997 Scottish devolution Referendum
 1997 Welsh devolution referendum
 1998 Greater London Authority referendum
 2011 Welsh devolution referendum
 Asymmetric federalism
 Devolution in the United Kingdom
 United Kingdom Confederation
 Historic counties of England
 Imperial Federation
 Regions of England
 Historical and alternative regions of England
 Unionism in the United Kingdom

Notes

References

External links
Federal Union website
Yorkshire Party Website
Mebyon Kernow Website
Wessex Regionalists Website
City of York Council page for One Yorkshire

 
Devolution in the United Kingdom
Political movements in the United Kingdom